Gregorio Baró (June 19, 1928 - May 28, 2012) was an Argentine scientist. He was born in Santiago Temple, Córdoba  and died in Buenos Aires.

Biography 
The son of Spanish immigrants from the Province of León, more precisely from Cabreros del Río, Baró married the writer María Dhialma Tiberti. He completed his Associate of Science in Chemistry degree at the Otto Krause Technical School in Buenos Aires, in 1945. Afterward, he pursued his studies at Universidad de Buenos Aires from which he obtained a Bachelor of Science, followed by a PhD in Chemistry in 1961 at the Instituut voor Kernphysisch Onderzoek, in Amsterdam. In 1968, he conducted research on the production of radioisotopes in Bombay, India, organized by the International Atomic Energy Agency.

Baró was additionally a professor at several universities, such as Universidad de Buenos Aires, Universidad Nacional de La Plata, Universidad Nacional de Cuyo, Universidad Nacional de Rosario, and Universidad Nacional del Litoral. He was named Emeritus Researcher of the National Atomic Energy Commission in 2010, following 40 years of institutional work and reaching the rank of Director. He was also awararded a Doctor honoris causa in Radiochemistry from Higher University of San Andres, Bolivia, notably for his work in discovering new isotopes of ruthenium, rhodium, rhenium, tungsten, and osmium, and for the development of a contrast agent for Magnetic Resonance Imaging during retirement.

He was the Argentinian representative of the International Union of Pure and Applied Chemistry (IUPAC) for several years. In addition, he served as consultant for the Comisión de Energía Atómica de Bolivia, the Comisión Chilena de Energía Nuclear, the Instituto de Asuntos Nucleares de Colombia, the International Atomic Energy Agency in Asunción, Paraguay, and the Centro Atómico del Perú, and the government of Uruguay.

References 

 Ciencia y Educacion
 CNEA
 La Prensa
 Martinez Ruiz, E. & de Pazzis Pi Corrales, M. (2010). Protección y seguridad en los sitios reales desde la ilustración al liberalismo. Universidad de Alicante: San Vicente del Raspeig.
 University of California. (1969). Who's who in Atoms, Vallency Press: London, 132 134.

External links 
 Asociación Argentina de Tecnología Nuclear
 Comisión Nacional de Energía Atómica
 Consejo Nacional de Investigaciones Científicas y Técnicas
 Universidad de Buenos Aires
 Universidad Mayor San Andrés

Argentine chemists
Nuclear chemists
Radiochemistry
Argentine people of Spanish descent
1928 births
2012 deaths